The Benalla Football Netball Club, nicknamed the Saints, is an Australian rules football and netball club based in Benalla, Victoria. Its football and netball teams currently compete in the Goulburn Valley Football League.

History
Benalla Football Club

The first published evidence of a club meeting was in 1871, to arrange a local football match on the Queen's Birthday holiday.

Football in Benalla appeared to of lapsed between 1872 and 1877, then the football club was re-formed  in April 1878, with a meeting at Hamilton's Hotel when Mr. D.G. McC. O'Leary was elected as president. "The first and inaugurating match of Benalla FC" was played on the Benalla Recreation Reserve on Saturday, 27 April 1878.

In May, 1878, Carlton Football Club played a match against a North Eastern Victorian team at Benalla.

In May 1882, Benalla hosted a match between the Melbourne Football Club and a North Eastern representative team, with Melbourne winning a tight contest.

In 1883, Benalla FC played their home games on the oval adjoining the Benalla East State School and "have given amusement to the public during many a dreary Saturday".

In 1884 and 1885 the club's colours were a "blue guernsey and red and blue hose and cap".

In 1886, Essendon Football Club played a representative team from the North East of Victoria  at the Benalla Recreation Reserve, which resulted in a win to Essendon.

Benalla initially played in the North Eastern Football Association in 1892 and won their first premiership in 1895 (unbeaten premiers), the first of three consecutive premierships.

In 1896, club patron's included John Alston Wallace (MLC) and Thomas Kennedy (MLA).

In 1897, Benalla's colours were blue, white and black.

Benalla FC went into recess from 1900 to 1902, with the Benalla Half Holiday FC and the Benalla Federals FC both playing competition football in these years.

In September 1908, Benalla's 28 year old captain and local Police Constable, James Cummins, along with Mounted Constable Daly, both drowned at the Benalla Waterworks Trust Weir.

In 1911, Benalla FC were not admitted into the Yarrawonga & District Football Association & went into recess, so as a result a new club was formed in Benalla, known as Benalla & Railway United FC referred to as "Benalla United" in local newspapers. This new club entered the Benalla Wednesday FA in 1911.

From 1919 to 1923, Benalla's colours were green and gold.

Benalla first entered the Ovens & Murray Football League in 1922 with their association continuing until 1928.

The O&MFL played Carlton in Wangaratta in 1922, resulting in a close win to Carlton, with three Benalla players representing the O&MFL.

In June, 1925, Benalla FC offered Cyril Gambetta their coaching job, but St.Kilda refused to clear him

In 1927, the club's colours were altered to red and white and Mr. J Skelton was elected a life patron. Fitzroy 18.7 - 105 defeated Benalla 9.9 - 65 in Benalla in late September, in what was a highlight for the local football supporters.

Mr. Les Hill was given a testimonial by the Benalla FC in 1927, after 17 years of service as a player.

At the club's 1929 AGM, Benalla Rovers FC took over the running of football in Benalla and their senior team was named the Benalla Rovers in 1929  and they wore a vertical black and gold striped jumper, known as the Tigers in the O & M in 1929 and 1930.

Between 1931 and 1941, Benalla's senior team played off in ten senior football grand finals, winning seven premierships. The only season Benalla missed playing in a grand final was in 1934 when they lost the first semi final to Wilby by one point in the Benalla Mulwala Football Association, in a real golden era for the club.

In 1931, Bernie Squires won the senior grade best and fairest award, while Dave Smith won the reserves grade best and fairest award.

In 1933, Benalla was known as the "Tigers" and lost a close match against Collingwood in October, 1933.

In 1940, Benalla 16.16 - 106 defeated Rushworth 11.16 – 82 to win their first senior Goulburn Valley Football League premiership in their first year in the GVFL.

Former 1930 and 1931 Benalla Junior premiership player, Jim Howell died in a Japanese Prison Camp in 1945.

From 1948 to 1997, Benalla were known as the Demons after they changed their jumper to a red jumper with a white V.

In late 1952, arrangements were made to set up a Benalla Junior Football League (BJFL) to start in 1953, with former Benalla FC coach, Ken Walker elected as the first President of the BJFL. This decision led to Benalla FC not fielding a Thirds team in the Benalla & District Football League.

In 1953, the O&MFL introduced a second eighteen (Reserves) competition for the first time, which meant that Benalla Reserves had to pull out of the Benalla Tungamah Football League.

In 1961, Benalla Football Club's Chiswell Pavilion was built and served the club well over the next 50 odd years, when it was replaced with the Lakeside Community Centre and changerooms in 2011. Charlie Chiswell was a former club President in the early 1960s and was instrumental in funding the building through a debenture scheme. The old Chiswell Pavilion was demolished in 2021, with only the front verandah remaining as a shelter.

When Benalla FC moved from the Ovens and Murray Football League to the Goulburn Valley Football League in 1998, they had to change their club colours and guernsey, which was to mirror the colours of the St Kilda Football Club.

Benalla Half Holiday Football Club (1899 to 1902 & 1908 & 1909)
The Benalla Half Holiday FC was formed as a junior club in May, 1899, wearing a blue jumper with a yellow sash. The club's jumper colors were changed to red, white and blue at a meeting in April, 1900. The club played in the Benalla Wednesday (Half Holiday) FA and wore maroon jumpers with white knicks in 1908.

Benalla Federals Football Club (1902 & 1903)
The Benalla Federals FC amalgamated with the Railways FC in 1902 and played a pivotal role as Benalla's main Saturday competition football club in 1902 and 1903, when they played in the Moira Football Association.

Benalla Gymnasium Football Club (1907 - 1912)
Formed in 1907, they went onto win three premierships in the Benalla Wednesday (Half Holiday) Football Association in 1908, 1910 and 1912. They then merged with Benalla & Railway United Football Club in 1913 to re-form Benalla Football Club.

Benalla & Railway United Football Club (1911 & 1912)
The Benalla & Railway United FC "Benalla United" was formed in 1911, decided on black and white hoops as their club jumper and would enter a team the Benalla Wednesday Football Association. Euroa Football Club won the 1911 Wednesday Football Association premiership and the Benalla Gymnasium FC defeated Benalla United in the 1912 grand final.

In 1913, local footballers wanted to play in a local Saturday competition, so Benalla United and Benalla Gymnasium merged and was reformed as Benalla Football Club, was admitted into the Yarrawonga District Football Association and played in the green and gold colours.

Benalla Rovers Football Club (1920 to 1930) & (1976 to 1989)

The Benalla Rovers were formed in 1920, when the Benalla Junior FC (formed in 1919) changed their name to Benalla Rovers FC at the AGM. Benalla Rovers FC won the 1920 and 1921 premiership in the North East Line Football Association. Benalla Rovers lost the 1922 Yarrawonga Line Football Association grand final to Devenish. In 1923, Benalla Rovers decided to change their colours to yellow and black, with black knickers. Remarkably, Benalla Rovers went through the 1923 season without a defeat to claim the Yarrawonga Line Football Association premiership.

Benalla Rovers were runners up to Yarrawonga in 1927, then won the 1928 Yarrawonga Line Football Association premiership.

In 1929, the Benalla Rovers FC took full control of the Benalla FC, including a debt of £60. The club entered Rovers A into the Ovens and Murray Football League, Rovers B played in the Yarrawonga Line Football Association and the Benalla Juniors played in the new Benalla District Football League.

In 1930, Benalla Rovers A played in the Ovens and Murray Football League, while Rovers B lost the Yarrawonga Line Football Association grand final to St. James, while the Benalla Juniors won the 1930 Benalla District Football League premiership, defeating Swanpool.

At the club's 1931 AGM, the club's secretary would not present the balance sheet due the auditor refusing to sign it, who later resigned. The club's name was then changed back to the “Benalla Football Club”.

Benalla Juniors Football Club (1929 to 1931)

The Benalla Juniors played in the Benalla District Football League from 1929 to 1931, playing in three consecutive grand finals, winning premierships in 1930 and 1931, wearing the purple and gold colours.

They changed their name to the Benalla Imperials FC in 1932 and joined the Euroa Line Football Association.

Benalla Imperials Football Club (1932 & 1933)
Benalla Imperials were beaten by Benalla Football Club in the 1933 Euroa Line Football Association grand final.

Benalla Imperials merged with the Benalla Football Club in 1934 and Benalla Seniors played in the Benalla Mulwala FA, while the Benalla Reserves played in the Benalla Yarrawonga Lines FA in 1934.

Competitions timeline
Benalla Football Club
Seniors
 1871 - Club was formed
 1872 - 1877 - No published newspapers reports during this period.
 1878 - 1885 - Club reformed and played friendly matches against other local towns and clubs.
 1886 - William Collins Cup
 1887 - 1891: ?
 1892 - 1898: North Eastern Football Association
 1899 - Devenish Football Association
 1900 - 1902: Benalla FC in recess
 1900 & 1901 - Thoona District Football Association (Benalla Half Holiday FC)
 1902 & 1903 - Moira Football Association (Benalla Federals FC)
 1904 - Brigg's Challenge Cup (Benalla "A" team: Benalla Wednesday Football Association)
 1904 & 1905 - Moira Football Association (Benalla FC)
 1906 - 1909 - Benalla Yarrawonga Football Association
 1910 - North Eastern Football Association
 1911 & 1912 - Benalla FC in recess. Benalla decided not to enter the North Eastern FA, but then were not admitted into the Yarrawonga & District FA, which left Benalla FC without a competition to play in.
 1913 & 1914 - Yarrawonga & District Football Association
 1915 - The Line Football Association
 1916 - 1918 - Club in recess due to World War 1
 1919 - Dookie & Line Football Association
 1920 & 1921 - Benalla Yarrawonga Line Football Association
 1922 - 1928 - Ovens & Murray Football League
 1929 & 1930 - Ovens & Murray Football League (Benalla Rovers FC)
 1931 & 1932 Euroa District Football Association
 1933 - Euroa Line District Football Association
 1934 - 1937 - Benalla Mulwala Football Association
 1938 & 1939 - Benalla Tungamah Football League
 1940 - Goulburn Valley Football Association
 1941 - Benalla Patriotic Football League
 1942 - 1944 - Club in recess due to World War Two
 1945 - Benalla Patriotic Football League
 1946 - 1997 - Ovens & Murray Football League
 1998 - 2019 - Goulburn Valley Football League
 2020 - Benalla FC in recess due to the COVID-19 pandemic
 2021 - 2022: Goulburn Valley Football League

Reserves
1904 - Brigg's Challenge Cup / Benalla Wednesday FA (Benalla "B" team)
1909 - Benalla Wednesday Football Association (Benalla "B")
1929 & 1930: Yarrawonga Line Football Association
1931 - 1934: Benalla Mulwala Line Football Association
1946 - Benalla & District Football League
1947 - Murray Valley North East Football League 
1948 - 1952: Benalla Tungamah Football League
1953 - 1997: Ovens & Murray Football League
1998 - 2019: Goulburn Valley Football League
2020 - Benalla FC in recess due to the COVID-19 pandemic
2021 - 2022: Goulburn Valley Football League

Thirds
 1947 - 1952: Benalla & District Football League
 1973 - 1997: Ovens & Murray Football League
 1998 - 2019: Goulburn Valley Football League
 2020 - Benalla FC in recess due to the COVID-19 pandemic
 2021 - 2022: Goulburn Valley Football League

Benalla Half Holiday Football Club
 1900 & 1901 - Thoona District Football Association (Benalla Half Holiday FC)
1903 - 1907: Club was most likely in recess
1908 & 1909: Benalla Wednesday Football Association

Benalla Federals Football Club
 1902 & 1903: Moira Football Association

Benalla Gymnasium Football Club 
 1907 - 1912: Benalla Wednesday (Half Holiday) Football Association
 1913 - Merged with Benalla & Railway United FC & reformed as Benalla Football Club

Benalla & Railway United Football Club (1911 & 1912)
 1911 & 1912: Benalla Wednesday (Half Holiday) Football Association
 1913 - Merged with Benalla Gymnasium FC & reformed as Benalla Football Club
Benalla Rovers Football Club
 1920 - 1923: North East Line Football Association
 1922 - 1928: Yarrawonga Line Football Association
 1929 & 1930: Ovens & Murray Football League
 1931 - Changed its name to Benalla Football Club
 1976 - 1989: Benalla & District Football League

Benalla Juniors Football Club 
 1929 - 1931: Benalla & District Football League
 1932 - Changed their name to the Benalla Imperials FC and joined the Euroa Line Football Association.

 Benalla Imperials Football Club
 1932 & 1933: Euroa Line Football Association
 1934 - Benalla Imperials merged with the Benalla Football Club.

Football premierships
Benalla Football Club
Seniors
This is a complete list of premierships won by the club in the different leagues where it played:

 1939 - Benalla were undefeated premiers.

Reserves

Thirds

Benalla Gymnasium Football Club

Benalla Rovers Football Club
Seniors

Benalla Junior Football Club

Netball premierships
Ovens and Murray Football / Netball League: 1993 to 1997
 No premierships

Goulburn Valley Football Netball League: 1998 to present day
A. Grade
 1998, 1999, 2000, 2001, 2003, 2004, 2007
B. Reserve
 2001
17 and Under
 2008

Ovens and Murray Football League: Best & Fairest winners
The list includes the following players:

 Seniors – Morris Medal
1954 – Kevin Hurley 
1968 – John Waddington
1990 – Jamie Ronke. Father of Ben Ronke – Sydney Swans.

Reserves – Ralph Marks Medal
1960 – Roy Symes
1968 – Norm Hogan
1973 – Graham Sherwill

Thirds - 3NE Award
1973 – Peter Nolan
1976 – John Martiniello. (Martiniello also won the 1993 Tungamah Football League senior football, Lawless Medal, with the Benalla All Blacks Football Club.)
1983 – Rod Brewster

Goulburn Valley Football League – Best & Fairest winners
The list includes the following players:
Seniors – Morrison Medal
1999 – Anthony Pasquali. Father of Seb Pasquali – Western United
2008 – Rowan Priest 
2013 – Luke Morgan 
2014 – William Martiniello
2018 - Sam Martyn 

Reserves – Abikhair Medal  
1998 – P Warnock
2007 – Chris Dube
2011 – Chris Dube. (Chris Dube also won the 2018 Ovens & King Football League senior football Baker Medal with Greta Football Club.)

Thirds – Pattison Medal
2002 – R Joyce

Hall of Fame inductees
Ovens & Murray Football League
 2008 - Neil Hanlon 
 2010 - Emmy DeFazio 
 2012 - John Brunner 
 2013 - John Martiniello

Senior football stats
Most games
 316 - John Martiniello
 251 - Emmy DeFazio 
 247 - Robbie Allan
 247 - Bernie Squires
 225 - Terry Greaves
 209 - Neil Hanlon
 196 - Bill Sammon
 100 + - Edward "Ted" Briggs
 100 + - Roy Symes
Most goals in a match
16 - Ricky Symes - 2005 - GVFL Rd.12: Benalla v Tatura
13 - Vern Drake - 1972. O&MFL
12 - Fred Beeson - 1923. O&MFL Rd.2 - Benalla v Lake Rovers
12 - Reg Roscoe - 1953. O&MFL Rd.17 - Benalla v Yarrawonga
12 - Norm Minns - 1954. O&MFL Rd.14: Benalla v Corowa.  
11 - Wheeler. 9 July 1928. O&MFL: Benalla v Beechworth.
11 - Bob Chitty - 1947 - O&MFL Rd.13: Benalla v Rutherglen.
11 - Josh Mellington. 5 September 2015 - GVFNL: Benalla v Euroa.

VFL / AFL players

The following 38 players played with Benalla, prior to playing senior football in the VFL/AFL, and / or drafted, with the year indicating their VFL/AFL debut.

 1897 – Jim Flynn – Geelong & Carlton
 1905 – Dave McNamara – St. Kilda
 1906 –  Cec Garton – Essendon
 1906 – Andy Kennedy – Carlton & Melbourne
 1907 – John Gilding – St. Kilda
 1909 – Tom McEwan – Carlton
 1924 – Fred Beeson – Fitzroy
 1925 – Clarrie Nolan – North Melbourne
 1927 - Dinny Kelleher - Carlton & South Melbourne
 1928 - Doug Ringrose - Fitzroy
 1935 – Jack Bridgfoot – Footscray
 1936 – Arthur Hall – Fitzroy
 1944 – Bryan Crimmins – Melbourne 
 1948 – Max Howell – Carlton
 1952 – Kevin Bond – Hawthorn
 1952 – John Brady – North Melbourne
 1953 – Kevin Gleeson – Richmond
 1954 - Kevin Hogan - South Melbourne
 1956 - Ray Lalor - Essendon
 1958 – Barry Connolly – Footscray
 1958 – John Stephenson – Carlton
 1958 – Frank Hogan – South Melbourne
 1959 – John Thompson – Richmond
 1964 – Neil Busse – Richmond & South Melbourne
 1968 – Kevin Sykes – North Melbourne
 1971 – Gary Cowton – Nth Melbourne, Footscray & Sth Melbourne
 1972 – Brian Symes – North Melbourne
 1973 - Michael Stilo - North Melbourne
 1976 – Chris Elliott – South Melbourne
 1985 – Steven Hickey – North Melbourne
 1990 - Andrew Harrison - Brisbane Lions. No AFL games. No 15 in 1990 AFL National Draft.
 1990 - Tim Symes - Sydney Swans. No AFL games. No 29 in 1990 Mid season AFL Draft
 1998 – Ricky Symes – Western Bulldogs. No AFL games. No.61 in 1998 AFL Draft. 
 2001 – Matthew Shir – Adelaide Crows
 2003 – Jarrad Waite – Carlton & North Melbourne
 2009 –  Tom Rockliff – Brisbane, Port Adelaide
 2011 – Josh Mellington – Fremantle
 2015 - Caleb Marchbank - Greater Western Sydney
 2017 – Harry Morrison – Hawthorn

The following footballers played senior VFL / AFL football prior to making their debut with the Benalla FC. The year indicates their debut season at Benalla.

 1923 - Tom Drummond
 1925 - Les Bryant
 1925 - Bob Merrick
 1926 - Jim Morden
 1926 - Wal Matthews
 1927 - Bert Lenne
 1946 - Terry Boyle
 1947 - Bob Chitty
 1950 - Ken Walker
 1956 - Len Fitzgerald
 1958 - Bob Hempel
 1960 - Les Reed
 1964 - Graeme Jonson
 1966 - John Waddington
 1970 - Vern Drake
 1980? - Robin Close
 1982 - Len Halley
 1984 - Wayne Primmer
 1988 - Phil Carman
 1990 - Mark Perkins
 1993 - Andrew Dale
 2005 - Anthony Stevens
 2006 - Mark Porter
 2008 - Michael Stevens
 2011 - Richard Ambrose

Life members
 1927 - J Skelton  (Life Patron)
 1933 - Thomas A Moore 
 1948 - Jack Talochino 
 1950 - Mrs. A W Roscoe 
 1953 - Mr. A W Roscoe 

All other club life members can be viewed via the club's official website.

Club honourboard
Senior Football

 - * includes goals kicked in finals
 - Ladder position is at the end of the home & away series of matches.

References

External links

 Benalla FNC Facebook page
 Early 1900s picture of Benalla Showgrounds
 1920 - Benalla Yarrawonga Line FA Premiers: Benalla FC team photo
 1928 - Benalla FC & Hume Weir FC team photos
 1929 - Benalla Rovers FC team photo
 1930 - Benalla FC & Yarrawonga FC team photos
 1931 - Benalla DFL Premiers: Benalla Juniors FC team photo
 1946 - Central Riding / Benalla & District WW2 Honor Roll
 1946 - Benalla FC team photo
 1947 - O&MFL Runner Up: Benalla FC
 1950 - Benalla FC team photo
 1953 - O&MFL Premiers: Benalla FC
 1963 O&MFL Premiers: Benalla FC team photo
 2015 - GVFNL Grand Final Preview
 2015 - GVFNL Grand Final photo gallery

Ovens & Murray Football League clubs
Sports clubs established in 1896
Australian rules football clubs established in 1896
1896 establishments in Australia
Goulburn Valley Football League clubs
Netball teams in Victoria (Australia)